Look Who's Laughing (aka Look Who's Talking) is a 1941 film from RKO Radio Pictures. The film is built around a number of radio stars from the Golden Age of Radio and centers around radio personality Jim Jordan as Fibber McGee from the comic duo, Fibber McGee and Molly, who plans to build an aircraft factory in a small town. Look Who's Laughing was followed by Here We Go Again (1942), with many of the radio stars reprising their performances.

Plot
In New York, Edgar Bergen does his last radio performance of the season, a doctor's sketch with his puppet, Charlie McCarthy, and his assistant, Julie Patterson (Lucille Ball). After the performance Bergen hosts an engagement party for Julie and his business partner, Jerry Wood. The next day, Bergen and Charlie are set for their summer vacation. Flying in his new aircraft, Bergen gets lost and lands in Wistful Vista, home of Fibber McGee and Molly.

Bergen's almost crash landing interrupts a meeting with Wistful Vista's Chamber of Commerce. Fibber, president, has just proposed the selling of the town's airstrip to Hilary Horton, owner of the Horton Aircraft Factory. The Commerce and townspeople thought Bergen's aircraft was carrying Horton.

Bergen and Charlie are welcomed with Fibber and Molly inviting them to stay at their home. Learning of Fibber's plans, Bergen offers to convince Hilary, his friend, to build his factory at Wistful Vista. Throckmorton P. Gildersleeve (Harold Peary), secretly working for Ironton Realty, a rival company wanting to purchase Horton's factory, gets a scoop of Fibber and Bergen's plans. He goes to Sam Cudahy (Charles Halton), owner of Ironton Realty, planning to back out of Cudahy's schemes. Threatened by blackmail, Gildersleeve tricks Fibber into paying for an elaborate luncheon to honor their guest. Gildersleeve's trickery continues when he meets Charlie McCarthy, fed up staying at Wistful Vista and wanting to find a way to leave town. Gildersleeve suggests that Charlie sends a fake telegram to Bergen saying that his former assistant, Julie Patterson (Lucille Ball), is ill. On the day Bergen is to fly Hilary Horton to Wistful Vista, he receives the telegram, thus suddenly changing his plans.

Bergen arrives back in New York, discovering Julie is well. Returning quickly to Wistful Vista with a protesting Julie in tow. Bergen's business partner, Jerry (Lee Bonnell), with his former fiancée and Julie's replacement, Marge (Dorothy Lovett), search for Julie. Meanwhile, Fibber, humiliated, resigned from the Chamber of Commerce. His house is also in foreclosure and Cudahy purchased the airstrip.

Charlie confesses to Julie that Gildersleeve suggested sending the fake telegram. Julie then devises a scheme to foil Cudahy into investing in some worthless land belonging to Fibber and for Gildersleeve to trade his land for the airstrip. Bergen successfully convinces Hilary to fly into Wistful Vista. Meanwhile, Jerry and Marge, still searching for Julie, have decided that they are still in love and get married. Back at the McGees', Molly discovers that Julie is in love with Bergen and advises her to "sabotage" him into marriage.

Everyone drives to the airstrip to meet Horton. As Fibber and Molly wait in Bergen's aircraft, he and Julie greet Jerry and Marge, who have just driven into town. When Fibber accidentally takes off, Julie and Bergen follow in another aircraft. Horton's aircraft is also coming and Fibber nearly crashes into him. Bergen climbs aboard the aircraft, and safely lands Fibber and Molly. After returning to the McGee house, Jerry and Marge announce their marriage. At that moment, Horton arrives and informs Bergen that he owns a controlling interest in the Horton company and can build a factory wherever he desires. So, with Fibber's good name restored, Julie embraces Bergen.

Cast

 Edgar Bergen as himself
 Charlie McCarthy as himself
 Jim Jordan as Fibber McGee
 Marian Jordan as Molly McGee
 Harold Peary as Throckmorton P. Gildersleeve
 Lucille Ball as Julie Patterson
 Dorothy Lovett as Marge
 Isabel Randolph as Abigail Uppington
 Lee Bonnell as Jerry Wood
 Charles Halton as Sam Cudahy
 Neil Hamilton as Hilary Horton
 Spencer Charters as Motel Manager
 Jed Prouty as Mayor
 Dot Farley as Mary Blaize
 Dorothy Lloyd as Maisie/Matilda
 Sterling Holloway as Rusty
 George Cleveland as Kelsey

Production
Principal photography on Look Who's Laughing took place beginning on May 13, 1941 and ending late June 1941. The working title of the film was Look Who's Talking. In the opening credits of Look Who's Laughing, "the two "O's" in the word "look" become eyeballs and the "O" in the word "who" turns into a laughing mouth."

In a March 1, 1941 story on its pre-production, the New York Times headlined "Lucille Ball and Husband, Desi Arnaz, to Co-Star."  
Arnaz ended up being replaced.  It would take ten more years to act with wife Ball, in TV's I Love Lucy in 1951.

Reception
Film historians Richard Jewell and Vernon Harbin in The RKO Story (1982) considered Look Who's Laughing a surprise winner at the box office. "Released just after the Japanese bombing of Pearl Harbor, it had a certain topicality and lunatic attractiveness, but the precise reasons for  the picture's sizeable box-office success must forever remain a mystery." The film historians did pinpoint one performance, "Lucille Ball gave a standout performance as Bergen's secretary."

Film reviewer Jim Craddock in a recent review of Look Who's Laughing in the VideoHound's Golden Movie Retriever 2001 compendium was charitable about a film where radio stars conveniently drop  into a town, writing, "Not much plot here, but it might be worth a look to fans of the stars, including Jim and Marion Jordan, better known as Fibber McGee and Molly."

References

Notes

Citations

Bibliography

 Craddock, Jim, ed. VideoHound's Golden Movie Retriever 2001. Detroit: Gale/Cengage Learning, 2001. .
 Jewell, Richard B. and Vernon Harbin. The RKO Story. New York: Arlington House, 1982. .

External links
 
 
 
 

1941 films
1941 comedy films
American comedy films
American aviation films
American black-and-white films
Films scored by Roy Webb
Films based on radio series
Films directed by Allan Dwan
RKO Pictures films
1940s English-language films
1940s American films